Walter Linck (3 February 1903 – 3 January 1975) was a Swiss sculptor. His work was part of the sculpture event in the art competition at the 1948 Summer Olympics.

References

1903 births
1975 deaths
20th-century Swiss sculptors
Swiss sculptors
Olympic competitors in art competitions
People from Bern
20th-century Swiss male artists